Bridgenorth Football Club (nicknamed the Parrots) is an Australian team formed in 1923 in Tasmania. Since 1996 they have participated in the Northern Tasmanian Football Association. The club's home ground is Bridgenorth Rec Ground, also known as Parrot Park, located in Bridgenorth, 7 km from Legana.

History and flags
West Tamar Football Association 1924-1969,
 1929, 1949, 1950, 1951, 1952, 1956, 1959, 1960, 1963, 1967
Tamar Football Association 1970-1984,
 1983, 1984
Northern Amateurs 1985-1995,
Northern Tasmanian Football Association Division One 1996-2011
 1996, 2010

Australian rules football clubs in Tasmania
1923 establishments in Australia